The National Rebirth Party (Turkish: Ulusal Diriliş Partisi) is a political party in Northern Cyprus without parliamentary representation. The party, led by Enver Emin,  had representation after the 1998 elections. The party merged with the Democratic Party.

References 

Political parties in Northern Cyprus
Nationalist parties